Paloma (Spanish for "dove"; formerly, Fosteria and Frenchman's Ranch) is an unincorporated community in Calaveras County, California. The community is in ZIP code 95252 and area code 209.

Gwin Mine, Paloma, and Lower Rich Gulch were mined for placer gold in 1849, and quartz was discovered by J. Alexander in 1851. Property here was acquired by William M. Gwin, California's first U.S. Senator, in 1851. After yielding millions of dollars in gold, the Gwin Mine closed in 1908.

The town today is registered as California Historical Landmark #295.

The town's post office operated from 1903 to 1918, when the name was Fosteria - from the Foster family, early pioneers.

Politics

References

External links

Unincorporated communities in California
Unincorporated communities in Calaveras County, California
California Historical Landmarks
1849 establishments in California